Laura Drake is an American author of contemporary romance. In 2014, she won the Romance Writers of America's RITA Award for Best First Book for The Sweet Spot.

Biography
Drake grew up in the suburbs outside Detroit, Michigan. She sold her Sweet on a Cowboy series, romances set in the world of professional bull riding, to Grand Central in January 2012. Before the first book in that series was published, she went on to sell a Harlequin SuperRomance in June 2012 and three more in March 2013. Her debut novel, The Sweet Spot, was released in the summer of 2013 and won a RITA for Best First Book.

Drake worked as a CFO until leaving to work full-time on her writing.

Bibliography

Sweet on a Cowboy series

Widow's Grove series

Awards and commendation

 Romance Writers of America RITA Award for Best First Book for The Sweet Spot, 2014
 Starred review in Library Journal, as well as Top Picks in RT Book Reviews

References

External links 
 Author's website
 Author's blog
 Official publisher page at Harlequin
 Official publisher page at Hachette

Living people
21st-century American novelists
American women novelists
American romantic fiction writers
RITA Award winners
Year of birth missing (living people)
21st-century American women writers
Women romantic fiction writers